The 2015 Morocco Tennis Tour – Casablanca was a professional tennis tournament played on clay courts. It was the fourth edition of the tournament which was part of the 2015 ATP Challenger Tour. It took place in Casablanca, Morocco between 12 January and 17 January 2015.

ATP entrants

Seeds

Other entrants

The following players received wildcards into the singles main draw:
  Amine Ahouda
  Yassine Idmbarek
  Lamine Ouahab
  Younès Rachidi

The following player received entry with a protected ranking:
  Javier Martí

The following players received entry from the qualifying draw:
  Laslo Djere
  Guillaume Rufin
  Franko Škugor
  Maxime Teixeira

Champions

Singles

  Lamine Ouahab def.  Javier Martí, 6–0, 7–6(8–6)

Doubles

  Laurynas Grigelis /  Adrian Ungur def.  Flavio Cipolla /  Alessandro Motti, 3–6, 6–2, [10–5]

Morocco Tennis Tour - Casablanca
Morocco Tennis Tour – Casablanca
2015 Morocco Tennis Tour